Ferenc Wekler (born October 23, 1955) is a Hungarian politician, who served as one of the Deputy Speakers of the National Assembly of Hungary from June 18, 1998 to September 15, 2004. He resigned due to a political scandal. He was replaced by Gábor Világosi.

Wekler was a member of the National Assembly of Hungary between 1990 and 2006. He was a member of the Alliance of Free Democrats since 1990.

References
Parlament.hu 
A Wekler-ügy a parlament és az SZDSZ vezetése előtt 

1955 births
Living people
Alliance of Free Democrats politicians
Hungarian-German people
Members of the National Assembly of Hungary (1990–1994)
Members of the National Assembly of Hungary (1994–1998)
Members of the National Assembly of Hungary (1998–2002)
Members of the National Assembly of Hungary (2002–2006)